Conus anosyensis is a species of sea snail, a marine gastropod mollusk in the family Conidae, the cone snails, cone shells or cones.

These snails are predatory and venomous. They are capable of "stinging" humans.

Description
The size of the shell varies between 30 mm and 42 mm.

Distribution
This marine species occurs off Southeast Madagascar

References

 Bozzetti L. (2008) Conus anosyensis (Gastropoda: Prosobranchia: Conidae) nuova specie dal Madagascar Sud-Orientale. Malacologia Mostra Mondiale 58: 15
 Puillandre N., Duda T.F., Meyer C., Olivera B.M. & Bouchet P. (2015). One, four or 100 genera? A new classification of the cone snails. Journal of Molluscan Studies. 81: 1-23

External links
 To World Register of Marine Species
 

anosyensis
Gastropods described in 2008